Angelo R. Mozilo (born 1938) was the chairman of the board and chief executive officer of Countrywide Financial until July 1, 2008.

Life and career
Mozilo was born in New York City, the son of a Bronx butcher. He received a Bachelor of Science degree from Fordham University in 1960. In 1969, he and his former mentor David S. Loeb, who had already started a mortgage lending company, founded Countrywide Credit Industries in New York. They later moved the headquarters to Pasadena, California, and then to Calabasas, California, in Los Angeles County.  Mozilo and Loeb cofounded IndyMac Bank, which was founded as Countrywide Mortgage Investment, before being spun off as an independent bank in 1997. IndyMac collapsed and was seized by federal regulators on July 11, 2008.

Since Countrywide was listed on the NYSE in 1984, Mozilo sold $406 million worth of its stock, mostly obtained through stock option grants. $129 million of this was realized in the 12 months ending August 2007.

In the beginning, Countrywide was a pioneer in the nationwide non-bank mortgage industry. Mozilo was very concerned with the quality of credit borrowers and the quality of their loans. When subprime loans came onto the scene in the late 1980s (Guardian S&L) and 1990s (The Money Store), his company did not participate. He privately described the subprime loan mavericks of the 1990s as "crooks". However, his company began to lose business to the subprime lenders. He had to compete with them or keep losing market share. Thus, by the early 2000s (decade), Countrywide began using subprime loans.

Perhaps more than any single individual, Mozilo has come to symbolize, and bear the blame for, the subprime mortgage crisis. In a New York Times feature on October 20, 2008, Henry G. Cisneros, former secretary of  HUD and member of the Countrywide board of directors, described Mozilo as "sick with stress — the final chapter of his life is the infamy that's been brought on him, or that he brought on himself." CNN named Mozilo as one of the 'Ten Most Wanted: Culprits' of the 2008 financial collapse in the United States., theory further supported in  Inside Job, an Academy Award-winning documentary on the global financial crisis.

Compensation
Mozilo's compensation during the United States housing bubble of 2001–06 later came under scrutiny. During that period, his total compensation (including salary, bonuses, options and restricted stock) approached $470 million. His compensation also included payment for equity memberships and annual country club dues at Sherwood Country Club in Thousand Oaks, CA, The Quarry at La Quinta golf club in La Quinta, California and at the Robert Trent Jones Golf Club in Gainesville, Virginia.   
        
Mozilo testified before the United States House Committee on Oversight and Government Reform on March 7, 2008, calling reports of their pay "grossly exaggerated" in some instances and pointing out that they lost millions as well. He defended the pay: The compensation was a function of how the company did ahead of the mortgage crisis.

SEC accusation regarding insider sales
Over many years, Mozilo sold hundreds of millions of dollars in stock, even while publicly touting the stock and using shareholder funds to buy back stock to support the share price. On June 4, 2009, the U.S. Securities and Exchange Commission charged him with insider trading and securities fraud.

Settlement with SEC
On October 15, 2010, Mozilo reached a settlement with the Securities and Exchange Commission over securities fraud and insider trading charges. Mozilo agreed to pay $67.5 million in fines, and accepted a lifetime ban from serving as an officer or director of any public company. It is the largest settlement by an individual or executive connected to the 2008 housing collapse. Robert Khuzami, director of the SEC's Division of Enforcement, said in a statement that "Mozilo's record penalty is the fitting outcome for a corporate executive who deliberately disregarded his duties to investors by concealing what he saw from inside the executive suite." By settling the SEC charges, Mozilo will avoid a trial that could have provided fodder for future criminal charges.

The terms of the settlement allowed Mozilo to avoid acknowledgment of wrongdoing. Countrywide was to pay $20 million of the $67.5 million penalty because of an indemnification agreement that was part of Mozilo's employment contract. 

In February 2011, the US dropped its criminal investigation into the facts behind the civil settlement.

Friends of Angelo (FOA) VIP program
   
In June 2008, Conde Nast Portfolio reported that several influential lawmakers and politicians, including Senate Banking Committee Chairman Christopher Dodd, Senate Budget Committee Chairman Kent Conrad, and former Fannie Mae CEO Jim Johnson, received favorable mortgage financing from Countrywide by virtue of being "Friends of Angelo".    
   
Democratic Senator Dodd received a $75,000 reduction in mortgage payments from Countrywide at allegedly below-market rates on his Washington, D.C. and Connecticut homes. Michael Moore's Capitalism: A Love Story shows on film that this was actually over a million dollars of a sweet-heart mortgage deal. Dodd nonetheless called for stronger regulation of mortgage lenders and proposed that predatory lenders should face criminal charges.    
   
Clinton Jones III, senior counsel of the House Financial Services Subcommittee on Housing and Community Opportunity, and "an adviser to ranking Republican members of Congress responsible for legislation of interest to the financial services industry and of importance to Countrywide." was given special treatment. Jones is now state director for federal residential-mortgage bundler Freddie Mac. Alphonso Jackson, acting secretary of HUD at the time and long-time friend and Texas neighbor of President Bush, received a discounted mortgage for himself and sought one for his daughter. "In 2003, using V.I.P. loans for nearly $1 million apiece, Franklin Raines, Fannie Mae’s chairman and C.E.O. from 1999 to 2004, twice refinanced his seven-bedroom home, which has a pool and movie theater."

Though Mozilo donated extensively to both parties during the Clinton Administration, he himself was reportedly a registered Republican. Speaker of the House Nancy Pelosi's son Paul Pelosi, Jr. also received a loan with Countrywide. Barbara Boxer, Adam H. Putnam, Richard C. Holbrooke, James E. Clyburn, and Donna Shalala are among those with mortgages from Countrywide. CBS News has obtained the following list of then-Fannie Mae employees whose names have been turned over to investigators as having received VIP loans from Countrywide:

Other controversies
Shortly after University of San Diego invited Mozilo to be the keynote speaker at a conference for "sustainable real estate", DisinviteMozilo was created in protest on January 10, 2008. Mozilo pulled out six days later. Shortly after that, Congress invited Mozilo to testify about his compensation. In May 2008, Mozilo made the news by accidentally hitting "reply" instead of "forward" in response to an e-mail from a distressed homeowner named Daniel Bailey of North Carolina. Bailey had created a hardship letter to request a loan modification from Mozilo on a website forum named LoanSafe.org. Bailey then sent his request directly to the Office of the President of Countrywide and this was Angelo Mozilo's reply. 

   
"This is unbelievable. Most of these letters now have the same wording. Obviously they are being counseled by some other person or by the internet. Disgusting."

In media
In the documentary film Inside Job Mozilo is cited as one of the persons responsible for the economic meltdown of 2008 and named in Time magazine as one of the "25 People to Blame for the Financial Crisis". Condé Nast Portfolio ranked Mozilo second on their list of "Worst American CEOs of All Time".

In the 2011 four part investigative series, Al Jazeera named Mozilo as one of the people responsible for popularising the trend of giving subprime loans to the poor.

As of 2016, Angelo Mozilo maintains a residence in Santa Barbara, California near the Montecito Country Club.

See also
 Subprime mortgage crisis
 Countrywide financial political loan scandal

References

External links

1938 births
American bankers
American chief executives of financial services companies
American white-collar criminals
American real estate businesspeople
Fordham University alumni
Living people
Businesspeople from New York City
United States housing bubble
California Republicans